The Ensemble 2e2m is a French musical ensemble specializing in the interpretation of works of the twentieth and twenty-first centuries.

History 
The Ensemble 2e2m was founded by Paul Méfano in 1972. 2e2m means études et expressions des modes musicaux ("Studies and expressions of musical modes"). It is one of the oldest ensembles devoted to contemporary classical music.

Repertoire 
The repertoire of the Ensemble 2e2m is essentially oriented towards contemporary music and the creation of new works. Over 600 scores have been created by the ensemble since its founding.

External links 
 Official site
 Ensemble 2e2m on La Muse
 Ensemble 2e2m on "Futurs composés"
 Ensemble 2e2m on France Musique
 Ensemble 2e2m on Discogs
 2e2m on FEVIS
 Biographie de l'Ensemble 2e2m on Centre National de Création Musicale

Contemporary classical music ensembles